Maico Gerritsen (born 21 March 1986 in Venlo) is a Dutch former professional footballer. He spent three seasons with VVV-Venlo in the Dutch Eerste Divisie.

Career
A product of VVV's youth system, Gerritsen spent three seasons playing for VVV's senior side, making a total of 19 Eerste Divisie appearances. During the 2007–08 season, he didn't feature for VVV, and was sent on loan to Belgian Second Division side K.F.C. Verbroedering Geel, then in last place in the division.

VVV released Gerritsen after the six-month loan at Geel. He joined Belgian Third Division side Bocholter VV for one season where he rarely featured, and signed with Belgian Fourth Division side Esperanza Neerpelt in January 2009.

References

1986 births
Living people
Footballers from Venlo
Association football midfielders
Dutch footballers
VVV-Venlo players
K.F.C. Verbroedering Geel players